Jeanne Alexise Gnago (born 14 August 1984), known as Jeanne Gnago, is an Ivorian footballer who plays as a midfielder for Juventus de Yopougon. She has been a member of the Ivory Coast women's national team.

International career
Already in the team by 2004, Gnago capped for Ivory Coast at senior level during the 2014 African Women's Championship qualification. She was also part of the squad that competed at the 2012 African Women's Championship.

International goals
Scores and results list Ivory Coast's goal tally first

See also
List of Ivory Coast women's international footballers

References

1984 births
Living people
Women's association football midfielders
Ivorian women's footballers
Ivory Coast women's international footballers
Footballers from Abidjan